Paul Richard Thagard  (born 1950) is a Canadian philosopher who specializes in  cognitive science, philosophy of mind, and the philosophy of science and medicine. Thagard is a professor emeritus of philosophy at the University of Waterloo. He is a writer, and has contributed to research in analogy and creativity, inference, cognition in the history of science, and the role of emotion in cognition.

In the philosophy of science, Thagard is cited for his work on the use of computational models in explaining conceptual revolutions; his most distinctive contribution to the field is the concept of explanatory coherence, which he has applied to historical cases. He is heavily influenced by pragmatists like C. S. Peirce, and has contributed to the refinement of the idea of inference to the best explanation.

In the philosophy of mind, he is known for his attempts to apply connectionist models of coherence to theories of human thought and action. He is also known for HOTCO ("hot coherence"), which was his attempt to create a computer model of cognition that incorporated emotions at a fundamental level.

In his general approach to philosophy, Thagard is sharply critical of analytic philosophy for being overly dependent upon intuitions as a source of evidence.

Biography 
Thagard was born in Yorkton, Saskatchewan on September 28, 1950. He is a graduate of the Universities of Saskatchewan (B.A. in philosophy, 1971), Cambridge (M.A. in philosophy, 1973), Toronto (Ph.D. in philosophy, 1977) and Michigan (M.S. in computer science, 1985).

He was Chair of the Governing Board of the Cognitive Science Society , 1998–1999, and President of the Society for Machines and Mentality , 1997–1998. In 2013 he won a Canada Council Killam Prize, and in 1999 was elected a fellow of the Royal Society of Canada. In 2003, he received a University of Waterloo Award for Excellence in Research, and in 2005 he was named a University Research Chair.

Thagard was married to the psychologist Ziva Kunda. Kunda died in 2004.

Philosophical work

Explanatory coherence
Thagard has proposed that many cognitive functions, including perception, analogy, explanation, decision-making, planning etc., can be understood as a form of (maximum) coherence computation.

Thagard (together with Karsten Verbeurgt) put forth a particular formalization of the concept of coherence as a constraint satisfaction problem. The model posits that coherence operates over a set of representational elements (e.g., propositions, images, etc.) which can either fit together (cohere) or resist fitting together (incohere).

If two elements p and q cohere they are connected by a positive constraint , and if two elements  and  incohere they are connected by a negative constraint . Furthermore, constraints are weighted, i.e., for each constraint  there is a positive weight .

According to Thagard, coherence maximization involves the partitioning of elements into accepted and rejected elements in such a way that maximum number (or maximum weight) of constraints is satisfied. A negative constraint  is satisfied if one element is accepted (say ), and the other rejected.

Philosophy of science
There has been some decrease in interest in the demarcation problem in recent years. Part of the problem is that many suspect that it is an intractable problem, since so many previous attempts have come up short. For example, many obvious examples of pseudoscience have been shown to be falsifiable, or verifiable, or revisable. Therefore, many of the previously proposed demarcation criteria have not been judged as particularly reliable.

Thagard has proposed another set of principles to try to overcome these difficulties. According to Thagard's method, a theory is not scientific if:

He describes the Aristotelian realist philosophy of mathematics as "the current philosophy of mathematics that fits best with what is known about minds and science."

Major works 
Thagard is the author/co-author of 13 books and over 200 articles.
Brain-Mind: From Neurons to Consciousness and Creativity. (Oxford University Press, 2019).
Mind-Society: From Brains to Social Sciences and Professions. (Oxford University Press, 2019).
 
The Cognitive Science of Science: Explanation, Discovery, and Conceptual Change. (MIT Press, 2012).
The Brain and the Meaning of Life Princeton University Press, 2010 
 Hot Thought: Mechanisms and Applications of Emotional Cognition (MIT Press, August, 2006)
 Coherence in Thought and Action (MIT Press, 2000)
 How Scientists Explain Disease (Princeton University Press, 1999)
 Mind: An Introduction to Cognitive Science (MIT Press, 1996; second edition, 2005)(Trad. esp.: La mente, Buenos Aires/Madrid, Katz editores S.A, 2008)
 Conceptual Revolutions (Princeton University Press, 1992)
 Computational Philosophy of Science (MIT Press, 1988, Bradford Books, 1993)

And co-author of:
 Mental Leaps: Analogy in Creative Thought (MIT Press, 1995)
 Induction: Processes of Inference, Learning, and Discovery (MIT Press, 1986, Bradford Books, 1989)

He is also editor of:
 Philosophy of Psychology and Cognitive Science (North-Holland, 2006).

See also
 List of University of Waterloo people
 Computational-representational understanding of mind
Thagard's website.
Thagard's blog at Psychology Today.

References

1950 births
Canadian computer scientists
Canadian philosophers
Fellows of the Royal Society of Canada
Living people
People from Yorkton
University of Saskatchewan alumni
University of Toronto alumni
Academic staff of the University of Waterloo
University of Michigan alumni
Fellows of the Cognitive Science Society